Echeveria rosea is a species of flowering plant in the family Crassulaceae, native to Mexico. A succulent, it has gained the Royal Horticultural Society's Award of Garden Merit.

References

rosea
Endemic flora of Mexico
Plants described in 1842